Emil Schöpflin (born 26 July 1910, date of death unknown) was a German cyclist. He competed in the individual and team road race events at the 1936 Summer Olympics.

References

External links
 

1910 births
Year of death missing
German male cyclists
Olympic cyclists of Germany
Cyclists at the 1936 Summer Olympics
Cyclists from Berlin
20th-century German people